Oxylamia tepahius is a species of beetle in the family Cerambycidae. It was described by Dillon and Dillon in 1959. It is known from Cameroon.

References

Endemic fauna of Cameroon
Lamiini
Beetles described in 1959